The 1998 Century Batteries Three Hour Bathurst Showroom Showdown was an endurance motor race for GT Production Cars. The race was staged at the Mount Panorama Circuit, near Bathurst, in New South Wales, Australia on 14 November 1998 and was won by Peter Fitzgerald and Jim Richards driving a Porsche 911 RSCS.

Classes
Cars competed in six classes.
 Class A: Supercars
 Class B: High Performance Cars
 Class C: Production Cars (Over 2500cc)
 Class D: Production Cars (1851 to 2500cc)
 Class E: Production Cars (Up to 1850cc)
 Class S: GTP Sports

Results

References

External links
 Porsche and Ferrari stage three hour dog fight, www.motorsport.com
 1998 Bathurst Enduro GTP 3 hour enduro, www.fitz-racing.com.au

Motorsport in Bathurst, New South Wales
Century Batteries Three Hour Bathurst Showroom Showdown